LIFT is a South African airline, which currently operates domestic routes from O. R. Tambo International Airport, Johannesburg using a fleet of Airbus A320 aircraft, operated by Global Aviation.

History 
LIFT was established in October 2020 and commenced operations on December 10, 2020. LIFT is a joint venture between former Kulula.com CEO Gidon Novick, former Uber executive Jonathan Ayache, and aircraft leasing company Global Aviation, a South African-based ACMI specialist that operates Airbus A320 & A340 aircraft. Other founder investors include entrepreneurs, Rael Levitt and Alon Apteker. 

The name, LIFT was selected after the public were invited to name the airline in a social media campaign. LIFT Airline was selected after being submitted by eight contestants, who agreed to share the main prize of free flights for a year. Their names are inscribed on the body of the first three aircraft in the fleet. The airline's name was revealed on October 29, 2020.

Destinations 
As of November 2022, Lift serves the following scheduled destinations:

Fleet
As of March 2023, the LIFT fleet consists of three Airbus A320-200 aircraft:

See also
Airlink, a South African regional airline.
South African Airways, Flag national carrier of South Africa.
FlySafair, a South African low-cost airline.

References

External links
Official website
Global Airlines

Airlines of South Africa
Airlines established in 2020
2020 establishments in South Africa
Low-cost carriers
South African brands
Companies based in Cape Town